Henry V. Rayhons (born May 8, 1936) was the Iowa State Representative from the 8th District. A Republican, he served in the Iowa House of Representatives from 1997 through 2015, representing the 16th District from 1997 to 2003 and the 11th District from 2003 to 2013. In 2014, Rayhons announced he would not seek reelection to another term.

Biography
Rayhons was born in Garner, Iowa. His father, Henry, Sr. was a farmer and his mother, Agnes, was a homemaker. He grew up in a large family with four brothers and four sisters. Rayhons attended a one-room country school for eight years and graduated from Garner High School in 1954. He did not attend college. Rayhons was first elected in 1996.

Rayhons is a member of the Lion's Club, Iowa Dairy Association, Farm Bureau, Iowa Beef Producers, Iowa Corn Growers Association, Iowa Soybean Association, and the Iowa Taxpayers Association. Prior to his service in the legislature, Rayhons was President of the Hancock County Farm Bureau. Additionally, he was a board member of the Iowa Farm Bureau, 1986–1996, and a Hancock County Soil and Water Conservation Commissioner.

On December 15, 2007, Rayhons married Donna Young, blending their families after the death of Henry's first wife, Marvalyn. Rayhons has four children, two sons and two daughters; Donna had three daughters. Donna died of Alzheimer's disease on August 8, 2014. In the same month, Rayhons was charged with felony sexual abuse in relation to a May 2014 incident where he allegedly had sexual contact with his wife at her nursing home; prior to the incident, Donna's daughters had met with nursing home staff, who in turn advised Mr. Rayhons that his wife no longer had the mental capacity to consent to sex. He was found not guilty at his trial in April 2015.

Electoral history
*incumbent

References

External links

 Representative Henry Rayhons official Iowa General Assembly site
 
 Financial information (state office) at the National Institute for Money in State Politics
 Profile at Iowa House Republicans

Republican Party members of the Iowa House of Representatives
Living people
1936 births
People from Garner, Iowa